Sivas Dört Eylül Belediye Spor is a Turkish professional football club located in Sivas. The team currently plays in the TFF Second League. The club was promoted to the TFF Third League after the 2009–10 season. They finally were promoted to the TFF Second League after winning the promotion play-offs in the 2014–15 season. They have also a volleyball team and played in Turkish Men's Volleyball League between 2011  and 2013.

Previous names 
 Sivas Dört Eylül Belediyespor (1995–2015)
 Sivas Belediyespor (2015–present)

League participations 
TFF Second League: 2015–present
TFF Third League: 2010–2015

Stadium 
Currently the team plays at the 3,200-seat capacity Muhsin Yazıcıoğlu Stadium.

Current squad

Other players under contract

References

External links 
Official website
Sivas Belediyespor on TFF.org

TFF Third League clubs
Football clubs in Turkey